The Australian Minister for Financial Services and Superannuation is a former ministerial portfolio of the Government of Australia that existed between 2007 and 2013.

The first Minister for Superannuation and Corporate Law was Nick Sherry, appointed following the Labor Party's win at the 2007 election.  The ministry was administered through the Department of the Treasury.

List of Ministers for Financial Services and Superannuation
The following individuals have been appointed as Minister for Financial Services and Superannuation, or any precedent titles:

See also
 Treasurer of Australia
 Minister for Competition Policy and Consumer Affairs (Australia)
 Minister for Finance and Deregulation (Australia)

References

External links
Minister's website

Superannuation in Australia